AIS Arena is a multi-purpose arena in Canberra, Australia. Its capacity is 5,200 and it was built in 1980. The arena was opened by the Prime Minister of Australia, Malcolm Fraser, on 26 January 1981 and was originally named the National Indoor Sports Centre and was the inaugural home of the Australian Institute of Sport.

History
The arena was designed by Philip Cox & Partners. Architectural features include a 1200 tonne suspended concrete panel roof supported by 12 steel masts and 36 mainstay cables. The roof has a span of 100.4 metres. The stadium is partly set into the ground to reduce its scale and to establish a visual connection between the landscape and the mast and cable structure of the roof. The AIS Arena is able to seat up to 5,200 people. The main contractor was John Holland Group.

Sport
The arena is home to the Canberra Capitals and Australian Institute of Sport (AIS) who play in the Women's National Basketball League (WNBL). While the AIS won one WNBL championship the Capitals have been far more successful and have won a record seven WNBL championships.

The arena AIS Arena was also home to defunct National Basketball League team the Canberra Cannons. The Cannons would win three championships while in Canberra yet they never got to celebrate a home grand final win as their three NBL titles (1983, 1984 and 1988) were all won in Melbourne. While the Cannons were playing at the arena it was known as "The Palace", in part due to the venue being by far the largest (from 1981 to 1983 the next largest was the 3,000 capacity Apollo Stadium in Adelaide), and the most modern venue used in the NBL during the leagues early years. The arena would be superseded as the largest NBL venue in 1984 when the Coburg Giants (later North Melbourne Giants) moved into the 7,200 capacity Melbourne Sports and Entertainment Centre.

The Cannons would play here from 1981 to 2003 before the team moved to Newcastle to become the Hunter Pirates. Among those who played for the Cannons during their time in Canberra include Olympians Phil Smyth, Mark Dalton and Ray Borner, former Denver Nuggets NBA guard Darnell Mee, as well as Willie Simmons, Joe Hurst, James Crawford, Tad Dufelmeier, Herb Mceachin, Robert Rose, and C. J. Bruton.

As it is in the nation's capital, it also plays semi-regular host to the Australian Boomers and Australian Opals men's and women's senior basketball teams, as well as the Australian Netball Diamonds. With respect to the latter sport, Giants Netball who compete in the National Netball League have played one home match since 2017.

The arena is also the home of the Canberra Roller Derby League.

During the COVID-19 pandemic, the AIS Arena hosted a mass vaccination clinic.

Concerts
The arena doesn't only host sporting events and can be configured in different ways. It can be used for trade shows, gala dinners, exhibitions or even as a cocktail venue with room for up to 2,500 guests. The arena is also used for major indoor concerts in Canberra with musical acts such as Bobby Brown, P!nk, Alice Cooper, Lady Gaga, Delta Goodrem, Jessica Mauboy, Matchbox Twenty, Def Leppard, Good Charlotte, Linkin Park, Blink-182, Ice Cube and Kelly Clarkson performing there. It has a capacity for 4,264 during concerts.

See also
 List of indoor arenas in Australia

References

External links

 Info about the arena
Archived information about the arena

Sports venues in Canberra
Buildings and structures in Canberra
Canberra Cannons
Canberra Capitals
Defunct National Basketball League (Australia) venues
Australian Institute of Sport
Netball venues in Australia
Music venues in Australia
Indoor arenas in Australia
Basketball venues in Australia
1981 establishments in Australia
Sports venues completed in 1981
Giants Netball
New South Wales Swifts
Philip Cox buildings